Dag Aabye (born 1941), is an endurance runner who lives in a renovated bus on his friends property not far from Silverstar Road, of British Columbia, Canada. Each August he competes, and often finishes, the 125-kilometer Canadian Death Race. The race is extremely grueling, with over 17,000 feet of climbing. In 2018, filmmakers Justin Pelletier and Adam Maruniak released a documentary on him entitled Never Die Easy: The Dag Aabye Story.

In the 1960s, Aabye was a ski instructor in Britain and worked as a movie stuntman, including working as an extra in the 1964 James Bond film Goldfinger. He soon after moved to the Whistler Mountain area of Canada where he became known for his first ski descents of the mountain.

References

1941 births
Living people
Date of birth missing (living people)
People from Sigdal
Canadian male long-distance runners